Vinicio Verza (born 1 November 1957 in Boara Pisani) is a retired Italian professional footballer who played as a midfielder.

Career
Verza began playing professional football with Juventus but did not initially feature for the first team. After a spell with lower-level side L.R. Vicenza, he returned to Juventus at the age of 20, where he would make his Serie A debut against rivals Fiorentina on 26 February 1978. He later occasionally wore the number 10 shirt for the club, and scored several decisive goals during the 1980–81 Serie A season, including one against Napoli at the San Paolo Stadium, contributing to the club's league title victory that year.

Honours
Juventus
 Serie A champion: 1977–78, 1980–81.
 Coppa Italia winner: 1978–79.

References

1957 births
Living people
Italian footballers
Serie A players
Serie B players
L.R. Vicenza players
Juventus F.C. players
A.C. Cesena players
A.C. Milan players
Hellas Verona F.C. players
Como 1907 players

Association football midfielders